The 1987 Los Angeles Dodgers season was the 98th of the franchise in Major League Baseball and their 30th season in Los Angeles, California. They finished in fourth place in the Western Division of the National League.

Offseason
December 10, 1986: Acquired Matt Young from the Seattle Mariners for Dennis Powell and Mike Watters
December 10, 1986: Acquired Tim Leary and Tim Crews from the Milwaukee Brewers for Greg Brock
December 11, 1986: Acquired Alex Treviño from the San Francisco Giants for Candy Maldonado
December 11, 1986: Acquired Ed Vande Berg from the Seattle Mariners for Steve Yeager

Regular season

Season standings

Record vs. opponents

Opening Day starters

Notable transactions
May 6, 1987: Acquired Orlando Mercado  from the Detroit Tigers for Balvino Gálvez
May 22, 1987: Acquired John Shelby and Brad Havens from the Baltimore Orioles for Tom Niedenfuer
May 29, 1987: Bill Madlock was released by the Los Angeles Dodgers.
June 19, 1987: Acquired Phil Garner from the Houston Astros for Jeff Edwards
June 23, 1987: Acquired Bill Krueger from the Oakland Athletics for Tim Meeks
August 17, 1987: Acquired Glenn Hoffman from the Boston Red Sox for Billy Bartels
August 29, 1987: Acquired Tim Belcher from the Oakland Athletics for Rick Honeycutt
September 21, 1987: Acquired Mike Sharperson from the Toronto Blue Jays for Juan Guzmán

Roster

Player stats

Batting

Starters by position
Note: Pos = Position; G = Games played; AB = At bats; H = Hits; Avg. = Batting average; HR = Home runs; RBI = Runs batted in

Other batters
Note: G = Games played; AB = At bats; H = Hits; Avg. = Batting average; HR = Home runs; RBI = Runs batted in

Pitching

Starting pitchers
Note: G = Games pitched; IP = Innings pitched; W = Wins; L = Losses; ERA = Earned run average; SO = Strikeouts

Other pitchers
Note: G = Games pitched; IP = Innings pitched; W = Wins; L = Losses; ERA = Earned run average; SO = Strikeouts

Relief pitchers
Note: G = Games pitched; W = Wins; L = Losses; SV = Saves; ERA = Earned run average; SO = Strikeouts

1987 awards
1987 Major League Baseball All-Star Game
Pedro Guerrero reserve
Orel Hershiser reserve
Comeback Player of the Year Award
Pedro Guerrero
NL Pitcher of the Month
Orel Hershiser (June 1987)
NL Player of the Week
Orel Hershiser (June 8–14)
Alejandro Peña (Sep. 28-Oct.4)

Farm system 

Teams in BOLD won League Championships

Major League Baseball Draft

The draft was altered this year and the January drafts and the secondary phase of the June draft were eliminated, leaving just the one June draft, which was expanded to more rounds to allow the Junior College players to be included. The Dodgers drafted 51 players in this draft, the largest collection of players they had ever drafted in one draft. Of those, ten of them would eventually play Major League baseball.

The top pick in this years draft was right-handed pitcher Dan Opperman from Valley High School in Las Vegas, Nevada. However, Opperman injured his arm pitching in the state high school playoffs his Senior season and would not be able to pitch professionally until 1989. He would eventually play in parts of four seasons with the Dodgers farm teams in Vero Beach, San Antonio and the last two with the AAA Albuquerque Dukes. In 63 games (all but one as a starter) he had a record of 19-22 and an ERA of 3.95.

None of the players from this years draft would leave much of an impression on the Majors. Pitchers Dennis Springer and Mike James had the longest careers, but were just average players at best.

References

External links 
1987 Los Angeles Dodgers uniform
Los Angeles Dodgers official web site
Baseball-Reference season page
Baseball Almanac season page

Los Angeles Dodgers seasons
Los Angeles Dodgers
Los